The Torment of Others is a crime novel by Scottish author Val McDermid, and is the fourth entry in her popular Carol Jordan and Dr. Tony Hill series, which has been successfully adapted into the television series Wire in the Blood. The novel was shortlisted for the Crime Writers' Association Gold Dagger, and won the 2006 Theakston's Old Peculier Crime Novel of the Year Award. As with her other novels in the Tony Hill series, the title is an extract from a poem by T. S. Eliot.

Plot summary
Several years after Derek Tyler was incarcerated for slaughtering several prostitutes, another lady of the night is found dead under similar modus operandi being vaginally penetrated using a dildo covered in razor blades. While Dr. Tony Hill tries to convince Derek Tyler to explain who the Voice is DCI Carol Jordan sets up a sting operation using Paula McIntyre. However the sting goes wrong and Paula is captured by the copycat killer Carl Mackenzie.

Carl rapes Paula, Carol and her team hunt for Paula, and Tony suspects that a police officer is controlling Derek and Carl as only someone involved with this sting could have sabotaged it. Tony confronts Sergeant Jan Shields, who has been using mind manipulation to make others kill because she's a control freak.

While this is happening Don Merrick goes to Scotland to capture the paedophilic child killer Nick Sanders but is killed by him. Nick is later arrested.

Reception
The novel received generally positive reviews from literary critics.

While this may not be the best starting point for those new to McDermid, enthusiasts will find all the key elements are firmly and satisfyingly in place. - Amazon.com

It is a tribute to the power of Val McDermid's imagination that she made this one seem so believable. - Daily Telegraph

2004 British novels
Novels by Val McDermid
Tony Hill series
HarperCollins books